Chorley Cricket Club is an English cricket club based in Chorley, Lancashire, playing their home matches at Windsor Park. The club's first team compete in the ECB Northern Premier Cricket League, while the Second, Third and Sunday development teams take part in the more locally based Palace Shield along with all Junior teams from a large and healthy juniour section.

The club gained prominence nationally in the 1990s when Chorley the final of the Abbot Ale ECB National Club Cricket Championship at Lords in 1994, 1995 and 1996. Chorley won the trophy beating Ealing in '94 and Clifton Bourton in '95 whilst losing to Walsall in the '96 final. The unbeaten run of 26 matches in the competition until the '96 final is probably unique. They were captained by the formidable  Roland Horridge.

Notable professionals who have played at Chorley include; 

Jo Angel (Western Australia & Australia) 

Josh Marquet (Tasmania) 

Chris Hartley (Queensland Bulls & Aus A) 

Friedel de Wet (Lions & South Africa), 

Tom Smith (Lancashire County Cricket Club)  

Siddhesh Lad (Mumbai cricket club, Goa) 

Roshen Silva (Sri Lanka national cricket team)  

Keith Eccleshare  

Colin Miller (cricketer) , 

Notable individuals who have played cricket for Chorley Cricket Club include; Bill Beaumont, Paul Grayson (rugby union), Paul Mariner & James Sutherland (cricketer).

Honours for Chorley Cricket Club include;

League Champions: 1971 & 1980

Northern League T20 Cup Winners 2018 & 2022

Slater Cup Winners: 1967 & 2000

Matthew Brown Trophy Winners: 1981

Martini Rossi Trophy Winners: 1982 & 1983

Slalom Lager Trophy Winners: 1991

Vaux Bitter Cup Winners: 1995

2nd Division Champions: 1954

Latus Trophy Winners 1989

Blackledge Trophy Winners 1991 

Lancashire Cup Winners: 1992

Abbot Ale ECB Cup National Club Championship Champions: 1994 & 1995
- Runners-up: 1996

External links
 Chorley Cricket Club season results & statistics
 [./Https://chorleycricketclub.com/ CCC Official Site]

Sport in Chorley
English club cricket teams
Cricket in Lancashire